Heliconius lalitae is a butterfly of the family Nymphalidae. It was described by Christian Brévignon in 1996. It is endemic to French Guiana.

References

 "Heliconius lalitae Brévignon, 1996". Insecta.pro. Retrieved February 5, 2020.
 "H. lalitae (Brévignon, 1996)". Heliconius Butterflies. Retrieved February 5, 2020.
 "Heliconius lalitae Brévignon, 1996". La diversité des Heliconius. Retrieved February 5, 2020.

Butterflies described in 1996
lalitae